"On Wings of Song" (German: "Auf Flügeln des Gesanges") is a poem by the German Romantic poet Heinrich Heine. It was published in Buch der Lieder in 1827.

Musical settings
Felix Mendelssohn set it to music as the second of his "six songs for voice and piano" (Opus 34-2, 1834). Franz Liszt arranged On Wings of Music for solo piano (S. 547). His song has been translated into other languages and has been adopted in school music textbooks for China, Japan and Korea. 

Other settings include that by Franz Lachner.

Poem

References

Poetry by Heinrich Heine